The LXXXIV Army Corps was an army corps of the German Wehrmacht during World War II. It was formed in 1942 and existed until 1944.

The LXXXIV Army Corps is most notable as the formation that guarded the landing grounds of the Allied Normandy landings.

History

Before the Allied invasion 
The LXXXIV Army Corps was formed on 15 May 1942 by renaming Höheres Kommando z. b. V. LX. In turn, the Higher Command z. b. V. LX had been formed on 15 October 1940 in Prague. The initial commander of the LXXXIV was Hans Behlendorff. The corps was subordinate to the 7th Army under Army Group D, and stationed in Saint-Lô in Normandy. Behlendorff was succeeded as corps commander by Gustav-Adolf von Zangen on 1 April 1943. Zangen was succeeded as corps commander by Erich Marcks on 1 August 1943.

With the Allied invasion imminent, LXXXIV Army Corps reported in late May 1944 that only half of the winter programme had been fulfilled and that many coastal batteries were still left to be installed. By March 1944, between 50 and 80% of the required fortifications in the area of the LXXXIV Army Corps had been operational.

Shortly after midnight on 6 June 1944, Allied airborne landings began at the Orne river and on the Cotentin peninsula. The LXXXIV Army Corps was subsequently put to high alert to react to the ongoing Allied invasion.

After 6 June 1944 
Because of its position within the German Atlantic Wall, the LXXXIV Army Corps was the first formation to respond to the Normandy landings by the western Allies. The forces of the 352nd Infantry Division (Dietrich Kraiss), headquartered at Le Molay-Littry, and of the 716th Infantry Division (Wilhelm Richter), headquartered at Caen, were closest to the Allied landing sites.

The forces available to the corps on invasion day were the:

 243rd Infantry Division
 319th Infantry Division
 352nd Infantry Division
 709th Infantry Division
 716th Infantry Division

Of these, the 243rd, 319th, 709th and 716th were bodenständig (static), i.e. insufficiently equipped with motorized vehicles and intended for non-mobile operations. Only the 352nd Division did not carry the designation bodenständig, and was the only formidable fighting force under control of LXXXIV Army Corps. The situation was further complicated by the fact that the 319th Infantry Division was guarding the Channel Islands and would be unavailable for the fighting in Normandy. The 21st Panzer Division, although not directly subordinate to the LXXXIV Army Corps, was stationed nearby at Saint-Pierre-sur-Dives.

On 12 June, corps commander Erich Marcks was killed in action. He was succeeded by Wilhelm Fahrmbacher, who was on 15 June replaced in turn by Dietrich von Choltitz.

By 24 July, the Allied landing ground had expanded to include Caen, Balleroy, Saint-Lô and La Haye-du-Puits. The LXXXIV, now supported by and supervising the II Parachute Corps, stood as part of the 7th Army on the left German flank north of Coutances. The LXXXIV Army Corps stood opposite the, from left to right from the German perspective, VIII U.S. Corps, VII U.S. Corps, XIX U.S. Corps and V U.S. Corps.

The Allied breakout from Normandy began on 25 July, when the 3rd U.S. Army, which became the Twelfth United States Army Group beginning 1 August, broke the positions of the LXXXIV Army Corps and penetrated the German left. The Allied troops reached Countaces by 28 July, Granville and Avranches by 31 July and advanced over Pontaubault into Brittany beginning on 1 August. The LXXXIV Army Corps was hindered in its operational capabilities by the Allied bombing campaign against the French railways. At the beginning of the Allied operation, less than two days of fuel were available for the forces of the corps.

On 28 July, the LXXXIV Army Corps was ordered by Paul Hausser, now in command of the 7th Army, to retreat southeast to strengthen the German frontline. As a result, there were even fewer German forces on the southern flank to oppose the advancing American forces.

Choltitz was replaced as corps commander by Otto Elfeldt on 30 July. Elfeldt later gave testimony about his time as commander of the LXXXIV Army Corps to British historian B. H. Liddell Hart. Günther von Kluge, commander of Army Group D, blamed Choltitz for the German defeat in Normandy and thus saw him removed in favor of Elfeldt.

By 5 August, the LXXXIV Army Corps had been forced back to Barenton and Le Teilleul, where it now stood on the left flank of the XLVII Panzer Corps. Now, the Allied forces began to bypass the German forces in the south to create the Falaise Pocket. The XV U.S. Corps and XX U.S. Corps outflanked the LXXXI Army Corps near Javron-les-Chapelles and marched south of the 7th Army to capture Beaumont-sur-Sarthe by 10 August while the VII U.S. Corps pinned down the Germans at Javron. Having captured Beaumont, the XV and XX U.S. Corps could advance effectively unhindered into the territory southeast of the German positions. The XV corps captured Carrouges, Alençon and Mortagne-au-Perche and attacked Argentan by 16 August, whereas the XX Corps, with the XII U.S. Corps on its right starting on 13 August, reached Chartres by 16 August, the same day that the XII Corps further south took Orléans.

By 16 August, the German forces were stuck in a small cauldron between Falaise, Chambois and Argentan, with the LXXXIV Army Corps and its superior 7th Army stuck just east of Flers and Condé-sur-Noireau. A German relief thrust allowed parts of the 7th Army to escape on 20 August, after which the Germans took a new defensive line far to the northeast, from Elbeuf over Les Andelys to Versailles by 25 August. The Allied Liberation of Paris was completed on that day.

The LXXXIV Army Corps did however not escape from the Falaise Pocket. Otto Elfeldt was taken prisoner on 29 August.

Starting in September 1944, the LXXXIV Army Corps was marked as status unknown in German documents. The corps was formally dissolved on 2 November 1944.

Structure

Noteworthy individuals 
 General der Kavallerie Rudolf Koch-Erpach,corps commander of LX Army Corps Z.b.H.  (1. October 1940 - 1 March 1941)
 General der Infanterie Max von Viebahn, corps commander of LX Army Corps Z.b.H.  (1 March - 1 December 1941)
 General der Artillerie Hans Behlendorff, corps commander of LX Army Corps Z.b.H.  (1 December 1941 - 15 May 1942)

 Hans Behlendorff, corps commander of LXXXIV Army Corps (15 May 1942 – 1 April 1943).
 Gustav-Adolf von Zangen, corps commander of LXXXIV Army Corps (1 April 1943 – 1 August 1943).
 Erich Marcks, corps commander of LXXXIV Army Corps (1 August 1943 – 12 June 1944). Killed in action on 12 June 1944.
 Wilhelm Fahrmbacher, corps commander of LXXXIV Army Corps (12 June 1944 – 15 June 1944).
 Dietrich von Choltitz, corps commander of LXXXIV Army Corps (15 June 1944 – 30 July 1944).
 Otto Elfeldt, corps commander of LXXXIV Army Corps (30 July 1944 – 20 August 1944).

References 

National Archives and Records Administration, several photos of original command staff rosters, 1942-43

Corps of Germany in World War II
Military units and formations established in 1942
Military units and formations disestablished in 1944